Antonino La Gumina (born 6 March 1996) is an Italian professional footballer who plays as a forward for  club Benevento, on loan from Sampdoria.

Club career

Palermo
La Gumina is a youth product from Palermo. He made his Serie A debut on 4 April 2015 against A.C. Milan, replacing Mato Jajalo after 88 minutes of a 1–2 home defeat.

Empoli
On 6 July 2018, La Gumina signed until 30 June 2023 with Serie A club Empoli.

Sampdoria
On 31 January 2020, La Gumina signed a contract with Sampdoria until 30 June 2024. The transfer was initially a loan until June 2021, with Sampdoria holding an obligation to buy out his rights at the end of the loan term. 

On 26 July 2022, he was loaned to Benevento.

Career statistics

References

Living people
1996 births
Footballers from Palermo
Association football forwards
Italian footballers
Italy youth international footballers
Italy under-21 international footballers
Palermo F.C. players
Ternana Calcio players
Empoli F.C. players
U.C. Sampdoria players
Benevento Calcio players
Serie A players
Serie B players